Volleyball events were contested at the 1998 Central American and Caribbean Games in Maracaibo, Venezuela.

Medal summary

References
 Central American and Caribbean Games volleyball medalists

1998 Central American and Caribbean Games
1998
1998 in volleyball
International volleyball competitions hosted by Venezuela